Saburovsky Rail Bridges are two adjacent steel bridges that span Moskva River in southern Moskvorechye-Saburovo District of Moscow, Russia. They were completed in 1924 and 1953, when Saburovo was a remote suburb of Moscow.

Saburovsky Bridge (1924)
The first bridge on this site was completed in 1924 as a four-span deck-arch bridge, designed by Lavr Proskuryakov. Spans are 42.0+53.4+53.4+42.0 meters long, total length 217 meters.

Abandoned Saburovsky Bridge
In 1936, a second, four-track bridge was laid nearby; in 1941, when the pillars were complete, work was interrupted by the war. Post-war examination revealed potential safety problems with these pillars, site was abandoned and a new bridge was laid in 1951. The pillars still stand between two existing bridges.

Saburovsky Bridge (1953)
The second existing bridge, completed in 1953, is a high through-arch bridge with a 151.3 meter long main arch which stands 31.5 meters above water level. It is the highest steel arch in Moscow (until the upcoming completion of Zhivopisny Bridge).

See also
List of bridges in Moscow

References
 

Bridges in Moscow
Railway bridges in Russia
Through arch bridges
Deck arch bridges
Bridges completed in 1924
Bridges completed in 1953